Riko E. Bishop (born December 15, 1956) is a Judge of the Nebraska Court of Appeals appointed by Dave Heineman.

Early life and education

Bishop was born on December 15, 1956 in Nagoya, Japan. Bishop received her Bachelor of Arts in education and English from Kearney State College in 1977. She then taught English and creative writing at several schools, Elkhorn Junior High School from 1978 to 1980, Mission Junior High School from 1981 to 1983  and Bellevue Public Schools from 1983 to 1985  and worked for marketing firm Bader Rutter & Associates from 1986 to 1989 before attending law school. She later received her Juris Doctor from the University of Nebraska College of Law in 1992.

Legal career

Immediately following law school, from 1992 to 1993 Bishop served as judicial law clerk for Chief Judge Richard D. Sievers of the Nebraska Court of Appeals. She then served as an attorney with Perry, Guthery, Haase & Gessford law firm, doing general civil litigation and appeals. She had represented plaintiffs in personal injury, medical malpractice and employment law cases. In previous years, she has built a mediation practice within the firm, which she had been with for 20 years. During her time with the law firm, from 1998 to 1999 she served as an Adjunct Instructor at the University of Nebraska College of Law.

Nebraska Court of Appeals service

On July 19, 2013 Governor Dave Heineman appointed Bishop to be a Judge of the Nebraska Court of Appeals. She filled the vacancy created by the retirement of Judge Richard D. Sievers.

State Supreme Court consideration

In July 2015, Bishop was considered for a seat on the Nebraska Supreme Court along with fellow candidates then-Judge Stephanie F. Stacy and attorney Amie C. Martinez. Governor Pete Ricketts ultimately chose Judge Stacy to replace retiring judge Kenneth C. Stephan.

See also
List of Asian American jurists

References

External links

Official Biography on Nebraska Judicial Branch website

1956 births
Japanese emigrants to the United States
21st-century American judges
20th-century American lawyers
21st-century American lawyers
Living people
American jurists of Japanese descent
Nebraska lawyers
Nebraska state court judges
People from Nagoya
University of Nebraska–Lincoln alumni
University of Nebraska faculty
20th-century American women lawyers
21st-century American women lawyers
21st-century American women judges
American women academics